Port Futsal Club (Thai สโมสรฟุตซอลการท่าเรือ) is a Thai Futsal club. They currently play in the Thailand Futsal League.

Honours

Domestic Leagues
Thailand Futsal League
 Winners (4) : 2007, 2018, 2019, 2022–23
 Runner Up (5) : 2010, 2012–13, 2014, 2016, 2017
 Third Place (2) : 2011-12, 2015
Thai FA Futsal Cup
 Winners (1) : 2018  
 Runner Up (3) : 2010, 2015, 2019

Continental
AFC Futsal Club Championship
4th Place (1) : 2010

Regional
AFF Futsal Club Championship
  Winners (3) : 2015, 2016, 2017

Current players

 

(captain)

Crests

External links 
 Thai Port Futsal Club
 Futsal TPL

Futsal clubs in Thailand
Futsal clubs established in 2006
2006 establishments in Thailand